The Finnish Figure Skating Championship was awarded in five events in 1938.

Men's single skating 

Competed in Helsinki on 30 January 1938.

Source:

Women's single skating 

Competed in Turku on 12–13 February 1938.

Source:

Boys' single skating 

Competed in Helsinki on 30 January 1938.

Source:

Girls' single skating 

Competed in Helsinki on 5–6 February 1938.

Source:

Pair skating 

Competed in Turku on 12–13 February 1938.

Source:

Sources

References 

Finnish Figure Skating Championships
1938 in figure skating
1938 in Finnish sport